William Goldberg may refer to:
 William Goldberg (diamond dealer) (1925–2003), American diamond dealer
 Bill Goldberg (born 1966), American professional wrestler
 Billy Goldberg (born 1966), New York City emergency medicine physician